The following is a list of events relating to television in Ireland from 1997.

Events

January
4 January – Irish television debut of US animated action packed series Chip 'n Dale: Rescue Rangers on Network 2.
8 January – Bob Collins is appointed Director-General of RTÉ.
13 January – RTÉ 1 screens a 26 minute drama short called Summertime starring Michael Townsend, Jason O'Mara, Natalie Stringer and Les Martin.

February
No events

March
30 March – Channel 5, the UK's fifth and last terrestrial channel, launches at 6.00pm. The first faces seen are the Spice Girls, who perform 1-2-3-4-5, a rewritten version of the Manfred Mann song 5-4-3-2-1. The channel is available in some parts of Ireland.

April
No events

May
3 May – Ireland hosts the 42nd Eurovision Song Contest. It is presented by Carrie Crowley and Ronan Keating from the Point Theatre in Dublin. Televoting is introduced in five of the 25 countries competing.

June
12 June – Síle de Valera is appointed Minister for Arts, Heritage, Gaeltacht and the Islands with responsibility for broadcasting.
30 June – Long running US animated series The Simpsons starts airing on Irish television for the very first time after not being shown for a long time since it was a series of animated shorts on the US variety show The Tracey Ullman Show. It will be first broadcast on Network 2 starting off with the final episode of the very first season Some Enchanted Evening (which was originally meant to be the very first episode of the series despite being the first one to be produced and made).

July
No events

August
No events

September
2 September – Long running American-Canadian animated series Arthur based on Marc Brown's well known books begins airing for the first time on Irish television on Teilifís na Gaeilge as part of its children's block Cúlabúla. It was translated and dubbed into Irish with the title Art ó Ruíarc although the original English version can be viewed on BBC and Nickelodeon via access to UK television broadcasting. The English version will start airing on Network 2 in 2003.
8 September – The Den returns to Network 2 with Ray D'Arcy as host once again after another summer break. The block opens up with some new series including debuts of the British children's animation Enid Blyton's Enchanted Lands (before airing in its original country which won't happen until 29 September) and the smash Nickelodeon hit Rugrats plus more episodes of Tom and Jerry Kids, The Enid Blyton Secret Series and Pinky and the Brain and the Irish programmes including Echo Island as well as Den TV's segments Den Pet Vet and The Joke Box.
September – The RTÉ Authority seeks permission from the Irish Government to find a partner to fund digital terrestrial television (DTT).

October
No events

November
24 November – The two mean puppet characters Podge and Rodge from the long running children's programme The Den star in their very own adults only series A Scare at Bedtime. The very first episode premieres on Network 2.

December
No events

Debuts

RTÉ 1
13 January – Summertime (1997)
14 June – Kennedy (1997)
Autumn – PM Live (1997–1999)

Network 2
4 January – Chip 'n Dale: Rescue Rangers (1989–1990)
4 January – The Adventures of Hyperman (1995–1996)
4 January – Quack Pack (1996)
6 January – Gargoyles (1994–1997)
11 January – The Twisted Tales of Felix the Cat (1995–1997)
17 January – Sabrina, the Teenage Witch (1996–2003)
20 January – Superman: The Animated Series (1996–2000)
21 January – Oakie Doke (1995–1996)
6 February – Suddenly Susan (1996–2000)
19 February – Matt's Million (1996)
22 February – Goof Troop (1992–1993)
27 February – Ace Ventura: Pet Detective (1995–2000)
7 April – Water Rats (1996–2001)
8 April – Road Rovers (1996–1997)
19 April – Marsupilami (1993)
1 May – Goosebumps (1995–1998)
9 May – KaBlam! (1996–2000)
19 May – Clueless (1996–1999)
2 June – Deep Fried Swamp (1997)
3 June – Fievel's American Tails (1992)
30 June – The Simpsons (1989–present)
9 August – Little Mouse on the Prairie (1996)
11 August – Iznogoud (1995)
September – Later On 2 (1997–2000)
8 September – Rugrats (1991–2004)
8 September – Enid Blyton's Enchanted Lands (1997–1998)
9 September – Mr. Men and Little Miss (1995–1997)
9 September – Jumanji (1996–1999)
10 September – Kipper (1997–2000)
10 September – The Incredible Hulk (1996–1997)
10 September – The Prince of Atlantis (1997)
11 September – Cave Kids (1996)
17 September – Muzzy in Gondoland (1986)
17 September – The Angry Beavers (1997–2001)
19 September – Polka Dot Shorts (1993–2001)
20 September – The Swamp Shop (1997–1998)
21 September – Noah's Island (1997–1999)
21 September – The Lion King's Timon & Pumbaa (1995–1999)
21 September – Brand Spankin' New! Doug (1996–1999)
24 September – The Wayne Manifesto (1997–1998)
27 September – C Bear and Jamal (1996–1997)
18 October – Waynehead (1996–1997)
3 November – Mummies Alive! (1997)
15 November – Bruno the Kid (1996–1997)
20 November – Johnny Bravo (1997–2004)
24 November – A Scare at Bedtime (1997–2006)
1 December – Don't Feed the Gondolas (1997–2001)
24 December – Father Christmas and the Missing Reindeer (1997)
24 December – Spot's Magical Christmas (1995)
25 December – Elmo Saves Christmas (1996)
29 December – True Tilda (1997)
Undated – Married... with Children (1987–1997)
Undated - Relativity (1996-1997)

Teilifís na Gaeilge
8 February – Romuald the Reindeer (1996)
2 September – Arthur (1996–present)
4 September – Cybernet (1995–2008)
5 September – Simba: The King Lion (1996–1997)
4 December – The Little Lulu Show (1995–1999)

Changes of network affiliation

Ongoing television programmes

1960s
RTÉ News: Nine O'Clock (1961–present)
RTÉ News: Six One (1962–present)
The Late Late Show (1962–present)

1970s
The Late Late Toy Show (1975–present)
RTÉ News on Two (1978–2014)
The Sunday Game (1979–present)

1980s
Glenroe (1983–2001)
Saturday Live (1986–1999)
Questions and Answers (1986–2009)
The Den (1986–2010)
Know Your Sport (1987–1998)
Kenny Live (1988–1999)
Fair City (1989–present)
RTÉ News: One O'Clock (1989–present)

1990s
Would You Believe (1990s–present)
Winning Streak (1990–present)
Challenging Times (1991–2001)
Prime Time (1992–present)
The Movie Show (1993–2001)
No Disco (1993–2003)
Echo Island (1994–1999)
Nuacht RTÉ (1995–present)
Fame and Fortune (1996–2006)
Nuacht TG4 (1996–present)
Ros na Rún (1996–present)

Ending this year
26 March – Gerry Ryan Tonight (1995–1997)
25 May – Return of the Swamp Thing (1996–1997)
30 May – Live at 3 (1986–1997)
31 July – Blackboard Jungle (1991–1997)
1 August – Deep Fried Swamp (1997)
23 August – Kennedy (1997)
16 December – Upwardly Mobile (1995–1997)
20 December – Sports Stadium (1973–1997)

See also
1997 in Ireland

References

 
1990s in Irish television